Ehuẹun (Ekpimi) is an Edoid language of Ondo State, Nigeria. It is sometimes considered the same language as Ukue.

Phonology

The inventory is:

The two rhotics have been described as voiced and voiceless trills. However, Ladefoged found both to be approximants, with the pair being raised (without being fricatives) but not trills.

References

Edoid languages